Home is the debut solo studio album by Irish singer Kian Egan, mostly known as a member of Westlife. Consisting entirely of cover versions, it was released Ireland on 14 March 2014, and on 17 March in the United Kingdom, through Rhino Records. A signed limited edition was exclusively released through Amazon.

Background
Egan said of the album, "I am incredibly excited to be recording an album with Warner Music. Music is my first love, and to be able to get in the studio to record these amazing songs by such wonderful writers is such a thrill and an honour for me."

Track listing

Charts

Release history

References

2014 debut albums
Warner Music Group albums
Covers albums